Kokanba Dam is a gravity dam located in Yamanashi Prefecture in Japan. The dam is used for power production. The catchment area of the dam is 62.2 km2. The dam impounds about 1  ha of land when full and can store 28 thousand cubic meters of water. The construction of the dam was started on 1962 and completed in 1963.

References

Dams in Yamanashi Prefecture
1963 establishments in Japan